The 2019 heat wave may refer to:

 May-June 2019 heat wave in India and Pakistan 
 June-July 2019 European heat waves

See also 
 List of heat waves § 2019